Olivia Juliet Bridget Chance (born 5 October 1993) is a New Zealand footballer who plays as an attacking midfielder or a left winger for Scottish Women's Premier League club Celtic and has represented New Zealand at international level. She formerly played for Breiðablik of the Icelandic Úrvalsdeild, Everton and Bristol City of the English FA WSL, Sheffield United of the English FA Women's Championship, and Brisbane Roar of the Australian W-League.

College career
Chance joined the South Florida Bulls in 2012. In her freshman year she was named to the All-Big East Rookie Team. She played four seasons for the Bulls leading the team in goals during the 2013, 2014 and 2015 season. Chance finished her college career with 31 goals from 79 appearances.

Club career
Chance played club football with Claudelands Rovers, helping them to become the first non-Auckland side in 15 years to win the national women's cup.

Breiðablik 
In July 2016, Chance signed with Icelandic club Breiðablik UBK of the Úrvalsdeild.

Everton 
Chance moved to English club Everton in February 2017. She made nine appearances for the Blues during the 2017 Spring Series scoring twice.

Brisbane Roar 
In November 2020, Chance left England and joined Australian club Brisbane Roar.

Celtic
In August 2021, following the 2020 Summer Olympics, Chance joined Scottish Women's Premier League club Celtic.

International career
Chance was a member of the New Zealand U-17 side at the 2010 FIFA U-17 Women's World Cup playing in all three games at the finals in Trinidad and Tobago.

Chance and Terri-Amber Carlson were the only two new caps included in the women's national team to contest the 2011 Cyprus Cup where she made her début in a 4–1 loss to The Netherlands in their opening game on 2 March 2011.

Chance was named to the national team's roster for the 2020 Summer Olympics.

International goals
Scores and results list New Zealand's goal tally first.

Honours 
Celtic

SWPL League Cup: 2022

References

External links

NZ Football profile 

1993 births
Living people
New Zealand women's international footballers
New Zealand women's association footballers
New Zealand expatriate women's association footballers
New Zealand expatriate sportspeople in England
South Florida Bulls women's soccer players
Expatriate women's soccer players in the United States
Expatriate women's footballers in Iceland
Women's Super League players
Everton F.C. (women) players
Brisbane Roar FC (A-League Women) players
Celtic F.C. Women players
Expatriate women's footballers in England
Sportspeople from Tauranga
Women's association football forwards
2019 FIFA Women's World Cup players
Bristol City W.F.C. players
Footballers at the 2020 Summer Olympics
Olympic association footballers of New Zealand
University of South Florida olympians
Scottish Women's Premier League players
Expatriate women's footballers in Scotland
New Zealand expatriate sportspeople in Scotland
New Zealand expatriate sportspeople in Iceland
New Zealand expatriate sportspeople in the United States
Expatriate women's soccer players in Australia
New Zealand expatriate sportspeople in Australia